L'Aventure Michelin is a French museum dedicated to the Michelin group located in Clermont-Ferrand, France.

Inaugurated on January 23, 2009, it shows the story, heritage and industrial products of the group over 2,000 m2.

The museum welcomes 100,000 visitors in 2019.

References

External link
 L'Aventure Michelin

Michelin
Auto racing museums and halls of fame
Museums established in 2009